Sommersby is a 1993 American romantic period drama film directed by Jon Amiel from a screenplay written by Nicholas Meyer and Sarah Kernochan, adapted from the historical account of the 16th century French peasant Martin Guerre. Based on the 1982 French film The Return of Martin Guerre, the film stars Richard Gere and Jodie Foster, with Bill Pullman, James Earl Jones, Clarice Taylor, Frankie Faison, and R. Lee Ermey in supporting roles.  Set in the Reconstruction era following the American Civil War, the film depicts a farmer returning home from the war, with his wife beginning to suspect that the man is an impostor.

Sommersby was released in the United States on February 5, 1993 by Warner Bros. The film received generally positive reviews from critics who praised the performances and chemistry of its lead actors as well as the musical score and was a box office success grossing over $140 million worldwide on a budget of $30 million.

Plot 
John "Jack" Sommersby left his farm to fight in the American Civil War and is presumed dead after six years. Despite the hardship of working their farm in Vine Hill, Tennessee, his apparent widow Laurel is content in his absence, because Jack was an unpleasant and abusive husband. She  makes remarriage plans with one of her neighbors, Orin Meacham, who has been helping her and her young son with the farmwork.

One day, Jack seemingly returns with a change of heart. He is now kind and loving to Laurel and their young son, Rob. In the evenings, he reads to them from Homer's Iliad, which the old Jack would never have done. He claims that the book was given to him by a man he met in prison. Jack and Laurel rekindle their intimacy, which leads to Laurel becoming pregnant.

Displaced from his courtship of Laurel, Meacham suspects Jack to be an impostor. The town shoemaker also finds that this man's foot is two sizes smaller than the last made for Sommersby before the war. Jack finds the local economy ruined, and his own land mortgaged and exhausted. To revive the economy, he suggests Burley tobacco as a cash crop. He persuades the townsfolk to pool their resources to buy seed, offering them to share-crop on his land, and to sell them their plots at a fair price once the mortgage is cleared. This raises further doubts in his old neighbors, who believe that the "old" Jack would not give away his father's land, and resentment about the inclusion of former slaves.

Joseph, a black freedman living on Sommersby's land, is brutally attacked and brought to Sommersby's door by hooded night riders proclaiming themselves the Knights of the White Camellia (one of them is Meacham). Jack is threatened, in an attempt to force him to exclude black people from the landowning, but he refuses.

Upon taking the townspeople's money, he buys the tobacco seed claiming that the crops will raise enough funds to rebuild the town church. All those that bought in on the deal set to work, transforming the plantation into a breeding ground of promise and prosperity. Laurel gives birth to a daughter, Rachel.

Shortly after Rachel's baptism, two U.S. Marshals arrest Jack on the charge of murder, which carries the death penalty. Laurel's attempts to save her husband focus on the question of his identity: whether this "Jack" is who he claims to be, or a lookalike who met the real Sommersby whilst in prison for deserting the Confederate Army. Laurel and Jack's lawyer agree to argue that her husband is an impostor. This would save him from hanging for murder, but he would still be imprisoned  for fraud and military desertion. Meacham devises this plan in exchange for Laurel promising to marry him upon "Sommersby's" imprisonment.

Jack fires the lawyer and sets about re-establishing himself as the real Sommersby. Several witnesses are brought up to discredit this Sommersby as a fraud, who state that he is  Horace Townsend, an English teacher and con artist from Virginia. One witness says that the man currently posing as Jack defrauded his township of several thousand dollars after claiming he wanted to help rebuild the schoolhouse there. He is also said to have deserted the Confederate Army and ended up in prison. Sommersby discredits the man's testimony by identifying him as one of the Klansmen who had threatened him earlier. He points out that Orin Meacham was another of those men and that this is all a set-up to try to rob the new black farmers of the land they have bought.

When Laurel is called as a witness, she reveals that his kind nature convinced her of his being an impostor, admitting "…because I never loved him the way I love you!". Judge Barry Conrad Isaacs calls Jack to his bench to ask whether he wishes to be tried as Jack Sommersby, even if it will certainly mean death by hanging. Jack states that he wants to be tried as John "Jack" Sommersby.

Jack is convicted of first degree murder and sentenced to death by hanging.  While awaiting death, he is asked by Laurel to tell the truth about his identity as Horace Townsend. Laurel mentions the book on Homer's works that he holds. Jack tells her the story of how a man had to share a cell with another man, who looked like they could have been brothers. After sharing a cell for four years, they came to know everything about each other.

Upon his release, Jack Sommersby killed another man, then died from a wound he got during the fight. Horace Townsend then buried Jack Sommersby, which is seen in the opening scene of the film. Horace decided to assume Jack Sommersby's identity. 'Jack' (who is, in fact, Horace) concludes by saying he cannot admit his true identity, because Laurel and the children would lose everything, and the newly-freed slaves who had bought plots of land would lose them.

As Jack is taken to the gallows, he asks Laurel to be amongst the crowds, as he cannot "hang alone". As Jack is about to be hanged, Laurel makes her way to the front of the crowd. Jack calls for her, claiming to the executioner that he "isn't ready". She calls back to him, and the two see each other before he is executed.

The closing scenes show Laurel walking up a hill with flowers. She then kneels by the gravestone of "John Robert Sommersby" and lays the flowers down for him. It is revealed that work is being done on the steeple of the village church, as Jack had wished.

Cast 
 Richard Gere - John "Jack" Sommersby/Horace Townsend
 Jodie Foster - Laurel Sommersby
 Brett Kelley - Rob Sommersby, son
 Bill Pullman - Orin Meacham
 James Earl Jones - Judge Barry Conrad Isaacs
 Lanny Flaherty - Buck
 William Windom - Reverend Powell
 Wendell Wellman - Travis
 Clarice Taylor - Esther
 Frankie Faison - Joseph
 Ronald Lee Ermey - Dick Mead
 Richard Hamilton - Doc Evans
 Maury Chaykin - Lawyer Dawson
 Ray McKinnon - Lawyer Webb
 Caileb Ryder/Caitlen Ryder - Baby Rachel

Reception

Box office 
The film was a box office success, grossing over $50 million in the United States and Canada and $90 million overseas, with a worldwide gross of $140 million against a budget of $30 million.

Critical reception 
Sommersby received generally positive reviews from critics. Review aggregator website Rotten Tomatoes, gives the film an approval rating of 63% based on 27 reviews, with an average rating of 6/10. The site's consensus states: "Sommersby stumbles as a consistently compelling mystery, but typically solid work from Jodie Foster and Richard Gere fuels an engaging romance." Critics praised the acting and chemistry of the two leads, Gere and Foster, but criticised the ending of the film.

Related stories 
Sommersby is based on the French film The Return of Martin Guerre which in turn is based on the true story of Martin Guerre.

The same basic theme was used in a 1997 episode of The Simpsons, "The Principal and the Pauper," when it turns out that Principal Seymour Skinner is actually Armin Tamzarian (a delinquent orphan from New Orleans) who assumed the identity of Sergeant Seymour Skinner when the latter was missing and assumed dead. When the real Seymour Skinner returns home, the townspeople turn against him, discovering that for all of his faults, Armin Tamzarian is actually a better "Seymour Skinner" than the real one. The episode's working title was Skinnersby, in reference to the film.

In the 1946 British war drama, The Captive Heart, the protagonist, a Czech army captain (played by Michael Redgrave) assumes the identity of a dead British officer, in hopes of avoiding being returned to Dachau concentration camp.

The 1957 film, The Bridge on the River Kwai, has a protagonist (played by William Holden) who has assumed the identity of his dead commanding officer in the hope of receiving better treatment as a prisoner of war.

In Libel (a 1959 film, and a 1935 play), Sir Mark Loddon is accused of being an imposter by Buckenham, with whom he was a POW during the war. They had shared quarters with Wellney, who had borne a resemblance to Loddon and at times pretended to be him. Buckenham alleges that Loddon is in fact Wellney impersonating the baronet. Loddon sues for libel but his case is hampered by memory loss, so that his wife, and even Loddon himself, start to doubt his identity.

Similarly, in Mad Men, Richard "Dick" Whitman goes to war in Korea and his commanding officer, Lt. Donald "Don" Draper, is killed in an artillery barrage. With his body charred beyond recognition, Whitman switches dog tags with Draper and assumes his identity. The widow of the real Don Draper, Anna Draper, hunts him down, believing Don has run out on her. Instead, she discovers the switch, becoming a very close friend of the fake Don Draper.

In the final minutes of the Family Guy episode Thanksgiving, another man claiming to be the real Kevin Swanson bursts in the door, claiming the other is an impostor in a spoof.

References

External links 
 
 
 
 

1993 films
1993 Western (genre) films
Films about capital punishment
American Civil War films
Films about identity theft
Films directed by Jon Amiel
Films set in Tennessee
Films set in the 1860s
Films shot in Virginia
Films shot in West Virginia
Films with screenplays by Nicholas Meyer
Regency Enterprises films
StudioCanal films
Warner Bros. films
Films with screenplays by Anthony Shaffer
Films scored by Danny Elfman
American remakes of French films
Films about the Ku Klux Klan
1990s historical films
American historical films
Films produced by Arnon Milchan
1990s English-language films
1990s American films